Bouse School District 26  is a public school district based in La Paz County, Arizona, United States.

References

External links
 

Education in La Paz County, Arizona
School districts in Arizona